William Mutwol (born October 10, 1963) is a former middle distance runner from Kenya. Running in 8:10.74 he won the bronze medal in 3,000 metres steeplechase at the 1992 Summer Olympics.

References

External links

1967 births
Living people
Kenyan male middle-distance runners
Athletes (track and field) at the 1992 Summer Olympics
Olympic athletes of Kenya
Olympic bronze medalists for Kenya
Kenyan male steeplechase runners
Medalists at the 1992 Summer Olympics
Olympic bronze medalists in athletics (track and field)
African Games silver medalists for Kenya
African Games medalists in athletics (track and field)
Kenyan male cross country runners
Athletes (track and field) at the 1991 All-Africa Games
20th-century Kenyan people